Tree Sticks! is a 1988 Soviet comedy film directed by Sergey Nikonenko.

Plot 
The film tells about an unusual and stubborn man who tries to create a perpetual motion machine and write a philosophical treatise, but feels himself a very unhappy person.

Cast 
 Sergey Nikonenko
 Ekaterina Voronina
 Galina Polskikh
 Leonid Kuravlyov
 Yevgeny Yevstigneyev

References

External links 
 

1988 films
1980s Russian-language films
Soviet comedy films
1988 comedy films